John Proctor, Jr. (October 9, 1632 – August 19, 1692) was a landowner in the Massachusetts Bay Colony. He was the son of John Proctor Sr. (1594–1672) and Martha Harper  (1607–1667). John and his 3rd wife were tried on August 5, 1692. He was hanged on August 19, 1692 in Salem Village, Massachusetts Bay Colony during the Salem Witch Trials after being falsely accused and convicted of witchcraft.

Early life
John Proctor was born in Suffolk, England. When he was just three years old, his parents brought their family to America. They sailed from London, England, on 12 April 1635 on a ship called the Susan and Ellen.

Upon arrival, they settled in the Chebacco area of Ipswich, Massachusetts. The elder Proctor owned many properties and was considered one of the wealthiest residents of Ipswich. He had two shares in Plum Island in 1664. He also held various offices within the colony.

Adult life
Proctor was a good businessman, comfortable working with people from all levels of society. Around 1653, Proctor married Martha. They had four children: John (1653–1658), Martha (1655–1658), Mary (1656/57–1657/58) and Benjamin (1659–1720). Many people have given Martha the surname of Giddon or Giddens, but no sources have been located to verify the accuracy information. 

Martha died in childbirth on 13 June 1659. Her death registry reads "Martha, wife of John Procter, died the 13 June 1659"; Benjamin Proctor was the only surviving child from this marriage.

On 1 December 1662, Proctor married Elizabeth Thorndike (1641–1672), daughter of John Thorndike, founder of Ipswich, Massachusetts. They had seven children: Elizabeth (1663–1736) married in 1681 to Thomas Very; Martha (1665–1665); Martha (1666–?) married Nathaniel Gowing; Mary (1667–1668); John (1668–1748); Mary (1669–?); Thorndike (1672–1759), married in 1697 to Hannah Felton, widow of Samuel Endicott, the grandson of John Endicott, the first Governor of Massachusetts Bay Colony and daughter of Nathaniel Felton and Mary Skelton.

In 1666, Proctor moved to Salem and leased a 700-acre estate called Groton farm (also known as Downing Farm) in Salem Farms, the section of Salem Township just to the south of Salem Village. The farm was leased from Emmanuel Downing, brother-in-law to John Winthrop. In 1668, Proctor received his first license to operate a tavern here and the license was renewed annually. The Inn was located on Ipswich Road about a mile south of the Salem Village line. Elizabeth (Thorndike) Proctor died on 30 August 1672 shortly after she gave birth to their seventh child, Thorndike Proctor. Proctor's father also died in 1672 and he inherited 1/3 of the estate in Ipswich. His brothers Benjamin and Joseph inherited the other 2/3 of the estate. Each portion was valued at 1,200 pounds.

On 1 April 1674, Proctor married Elizabeth Bassett (1651–?), daughter of William and Sarah (Burt) Bassett of Lynn, Massachusetts. They had seven children: William (1674/5 – after 1695); Sarah (1677–1751); Samuel (1685–1765); Elisha (1687–1688); Abigail (1689 – after 1695); Joseph (before 1691 – ?); John (1693–1745).

Elizabeth and some of the older children ran the tavern while Proctor and his eldest son, Benjamin, tended to their extensive farm properties in Salem and Ipswich. If customers in the tavern had insufficient funds, Elizabeth insisted they pay with pawned goods.

Giles Corey became easily frustrated with his neighbors. At one point, he filed a lawsuit against Proctor who had suggested that Corey was responsible for setting the Proctor house on fire. Later, one of Proctor's sons confessed.

Accusations and trial
Initial accusations were aimed at Proctor's third wife, Elizabeth (Bassett). When he began to defend her and vocally express his disbelief in the accusers, fingers were then pointed at him as well. Although Abigail Williams was John Proctor's chief accuser, he was also named by Mary Walcott, who stated he tried to choke her and by his former servant Mary Warren on 21 April. Warren told magistrates that Proctor had beaten her for putting up a prayer bill before forcing her to touch the Devil's Book. Further allegations of an increasingly salacious nature followed. Proctor continued to challenge the veracity of spectral evidence and the validity of the Court of Oyer and Terminer, which led to a petition signed by 32 neighbors in his favor. The signatories stated that Proctor had lived a "Christian life in his family and was ever ready to help such as they stood in need".

The Proctors were tried on 5 August 1692, found guilty, and sentenced to death by hanging. While Proctor and his wife were still in jail, the sheriff seized all of their household belongings. The cattle were sold cheaply, slaughtered, or shipped to the West Indies. The beer barrels at the tavern were emptied. Their children were left with no means of support. Proctor was hanged on 19 August 1692. Elizabeth, who was then pregnant, was given a reprieve until she gave birth, which came after the trials ended.

Accusations against other Proctor family members
In 1692, one hundred and forty-one complaints were filed. Of those, twelve were against relatives or extended members of the Proctor family. John Proctor, Elizabeth Proctor, and Rebecca Nurse were convicted, and John and Rebecca were executed.

John Proctor, husband of Elizabeth Bassett aka Elizabeth Proctor and the father of Benjamin, William, and Sarah Proctor.
Elizabeth Bassett Proctor, third wife of John Proctor.
Benjamin Proctor, son of John Proctor and his first wife Martha.
William Proctor, son of John Proctor and his third wife, Elizabeth Bassett Proctor.
Mary Bassett DeRich was the sister of Elizabeth Bassett Proctor.

Extended family:
Thomas Farrar Sr., father-in-law of Elizabeth (Hood) Farrar, sister of Sarah Hood aka Sarah Bassett
Elizabeth Hutchinson, wife of Isaac Hart whose daughter, Deborah Hart, was married to Benjamin Proctor, brother of John Proctor.
Elizabeth Proctor, daughter of John Proctor and Elizabeth Thorndike Proctor, married Thomas Very in 1681. His sister, Elizabeth Very was the second wife of John Nurse, the eldest son of Francis and Rebecca (née Towne) Nurse.
Rebecca Nurse, sister of Mary Eastey and Sarah Cloyce.
Mary Eastey, sister of Rebecca Nurse and Sarah Cloyce.
Sarah Cloyce, sister of Rebecca Nurse and Mary Eastey.
Esther Elwell (née Dutch), aka Hester Elwell, was wed to Samuel Elwell, brother of Thomas Elwell; sister-in-law to Sarah Bassett Elwell, another of Elizabeth Bassett Proctor's sisters.
 
Family Tree:

Related accuser
One other family member was drawn into the Trials, joining the accusers: 16-year-old John DeRich, son of the imprisoned Bassett, and her husband, Michel DeRich, who had recently died.

Aftermath 
In January 1693, while still in jail, Elizabeth Bassett Proctor gave birth to a son, whom she named John. Elizabeth and her son remained in jail until May 1693, when a general release freed all of those prisoners who remained jailed. Unfortunately, even though the general belief was that innocent people had been wrongly convicted, Elizabeth had been convicted and was considered guilty. In the eyes of the law, she was considered a "dead woman" and could not claim any of her husband's estate. Elizabeth petitioned the court for a reversal of attainder to restore her legal rights. No action was taken for seven years.

In June 1696, Elizabeth filed an appeal to contest her husband's will. She testified in court that "in that sad time of darkness before my said husband was executed it is evident somebody had contrived a will and brought it to him to sign, wherein his whole estate is disposed of." The will had already been probated and assets distributed and she stated that her step-children "will not suffer me to have one penny of the estate, neither upon the account of my husband's contract with me before marriage nor yet upon the account of the dower which, as I humbly conceive, doth belong or ought to belong to me by law, for they say that I am dead in the law".

On 22 September 1696, Elizabeth remarried to Daniel Richards. On 19 April 1697, the probate court ordered Elizabeth's step-children to return to her the dowry as she was "now restored to benefit of law.

On 2 March 1703, twenty-one spouses and children of those condemned, as well as three women who were convicted but not executed, including Elizabeth, filed petitions before any action was taken on Elizabeth's appeal for reversal of attainder. They requested that "something may be publicly done to take off infamy from the names". Two more petitions were filed in June 1703. These included requests from eleven ministers to reconsider the convictions and restore the good names of the citizens. The Massachusetts House of Representatives finally passed a bill disallowing spectral evidence. However, they only gave a reversal of attainder only for those who had filed petitions.

In 1705, another petition was filed requesting a more equitable settlement for those wrongly accused. In May 1709, 22 people who had been convicted of witchcraft, or whose parents had been convicted of witchcraft, presented the General Court with a petition to take action on the 1705 proposal demanding both a reversal of attainder and compensation for financial losses. In May 1710, the legislature appointed a committee to hear the petitions. After many delays, on 17 October 1711, the General Court passed a bill reversing the judgment against the people listed in the 1709 petition and Governor Joseph Dudley signed the bill into law. There were still an additional seven people who had been convicted but had not signed the petition. There was no reversal of attainder for them. The bill read as follows:

The 22 people in the 1709 petition were awarded the sum of £578-12-0 to be divided among the survivors and relatives of those accused. However, reversal of attainder and monies were only awarded to the accused and their heirs who had asked for it. £150 were awarded to "John Proctor and wife, but Elizabeth's name was not specifically mentioned. Thorndike Proctor received money for his family's suffering. His older brother Benjamin objected as he had been the one responsible for taking care of his siblings during this time. The court took no action, leaving it up to the family to determine how to divide the funds. Most of the accounts were settled within a year. The award to the Proctor family was $1500, much more money from the Massachusetts General Court than most families of accused witches, a possible indicator of the wealth of the families involved. 

Thorndike Proctor purchased the Groton Farm from the Downing family of London, England, following the hanging of his father. The farm was renamed Downing Farm. Thorndike subsequently sold nearly half of Downing Farm to his half-brother Benjamin. Eight generations of Proctors resided on the Downing farm, until 1851.

By 1957, not all the condemned had been exonerated. Descendants of those falsely accused demanded the General Court clear the names of their family members. In 1957, an act was passed pronouncing the innocence of those accused, however, it only listed Ann Pudeator by name and the others as "certain other persons", still not including all names of those convicted. They also included a resolution prohibiting further lawsuits based on old court proceedings.

In 1992, the Danvers Tercentennial Committee persuaded the Massachusetts House of Representatives to issue a resolution honoring "the courage and steadfastness of these condemned persons who adhered to truth when the legal, clerical, and political institutions failed them". While the document did list the names of all those not previously granted reversal of attainder, it only noted that these individuals were "worthy of remembrance and commemoration".

After many efforts by a Salem schoolteacher, Paula Keene, Representatives J. Michael Ruane and Paul Tirone and several others, when it was finally signed on 31 October 2001 by Governor Jane Swift, more than 300 years later, all were finally proclaimed innocent.

The Crucible

In The Crucible by Arthur Miller, a 1953 fictionalized version of the trials portrayed as a theatrical play, John Proctor is cast as the main character whose story is centered around his powerful and unrivaled position in the society and consequential wrongfully convicted fate. However, the story line of the play diverges from his actual history in numerous ways, including:

 Proctor is portrayed as being in his thirties and Abigail Williams is seventeen years old, while the real John Proctor and Abigail Williams were about sixty and eleven or twelve years old, respectively, at the time of the witch trials.
 Proctor is revealed to have had an affair with Abigail Williams but he has a hatred to Reverend Samuel Parris because he is entirely materialistic. He hates him so much he does not attend church for many months. When they are discovered, Elizabeth Proctor discharges Abigail from the Proctor household and as a result, Abigail accuses Elizabeth Proctor of witchcraft as retaliation, as well as to get her out of the picture so she and John can further pursue their "relationship". In reality, Elizabeth Proctor was initially named by Ann Putnam on 6 March, alleging that Proctor's specter attacked the girl. She was accused by Abigail on 14 March, and further accusations were made by Mercy Lewis.
 Miller has Mary Warren accusing Proctor of afflicting her but this followed his initial accusation by Abigail in early April 1692. There is no historical evidence to suggest that Abigail even knew John Proctor before she accused him of witchcraft.

In the 1957 screen adaptation of Miller's piece, Proctor was depicted by Yves Montand. In the 1996 film based on the play, Proctor was played by Daniel Day-Lewis.

Citations

Cited references 
 Felton, Cyrus (1886) "A Genealogical History of the Felton Family: Descendants of Lieutenant Nathaniel Felton Who Came to Salem Massachusetts in 1633; with Few Supplements and Appendices of the Names of Some of the Ancestors and Families that have Intermarried with them; An Index Alphabetically Arranged of the Felton Families and an Index of Other Names than Felton", Pratt Brothers Printers and Publishers, Marlborough 
 Foulds, Diane E. (2010), Death in Salem, The Private Lives Behind the 1692 Witch Hunt, Globe Pequot Press, Guilford, CT, 
 Hall, David D. Witch-Hunting in Seventeenth-Century New England: A Documentary History 1638–1693, Second Edition; Duke University Press; Boston, Mass., USA; 2005, pp. 185-189. 
 Hill, Frances (2000). The Salem Witch Trials Reader, Da Capo Press, Boston, Massachusetts, 
 Nevins, Winfield S. (1916), Witchcraft in Salem Village in 1692, Together with a Review of the Opinions of Modern Writers and Psychologists in Regard to the Outbreak of the Evil in America, fifth edition with preface of striking interest, Salem Press Company, Salem, Massachusetts Witchcraft in Salem Village in 1692: Together with a Review of the Opinions of Modern Writers and Psychologists in Regard to Outbreak of the Evil in America
 Proctor, A. Carlton (1979 & 1982), Proctor Genealogy ca 1562 to 1982, Descendants of Evan and Mary Proctor, St. Albans, Hertfordshire, England; Robert and Jane (Hildreth) Proctor, Concord-Chelmsford, Massachusetts, USA; John and Martha Proctor, Yorkshire, England and Many of their Related Families, 
 Roach, Marilynne K. (2002), The Salem Witch Trials, A Day-By-Day Chronicle of a Community Under Siege, p. 587,  New York: Cooper Square Press.  
 Robinson, Enders A. (1991). The Devil Discovered: Salem Witchcraft, 1692, Hippocrene Books, New York,

General sources 
 Boyer, Paul, and Stephen Nissenbaum, ed. The Salem witchcraft papers: verbatim transcripts of the legal documents of the Salem witchcraft outbreak of 1692 volume 1, compiled and transcribed by the Works Progress Administration, under the supervision of Archie N. Frost; edited and with an introduction and index by Paul Boyer and Stephen Nissenbaum; Electronic Text Center, University of Virginia Library; Essex County Archives, Salem—Witchcraft
 Boyer, Paul. Salem Possessed: The Social Origins of Witchcraft
 Hanson, J. W. (1848). The History of the Town of Danvers, from its Earliest Settlement to 1848, published by the author, printed at the Courier Office, Danvers, Massachusetts
 Hill, Frances. A Delusion of Satan: The Full Story of the Salem Witch Trials
 Jackson, Shirley. The Witchcraft of Salem Village
 Miller, Arthur (1953). The Crucible
 Robotti, Francis Diane. Chronicles of Old Salem, A History in Miniature
 Smith, Sarah Saunders (1897). The Founders of the Massachusetts Bay Colony, A Careful Research of the Earliest Records of Many of the Foremost Settlers of the New England Colony: Compiled From The Earliest Church and State Records, and Valuable Private Papers Retained by Descendants for Many Generations, Press of the Sun Printing Company, Pittsfield Massachusetts.
 Starkey, Marion L. (1949). The Devil in Massachusetts: A Modern Enquiry Into the Salem Witch Trials, Anchor Books / Doubleday Books, New York
 Starkey, Marion Lena. The Visionary Girls: Witchcraft in Salem Village
 Taylor, Betsy (2003). "Documents Shed New Light On Witchcraft Trials", The Salem News, Danvers, Massachusetts
 Trask, Richard B. The Devil Hath Been Raised: A Documentary History of the Salem Village Witchcraft Outbreak of March 1692
 Famous American Trials: Salem Witchcraft Trials 1692: John Proctor—University of Missouri-Kansas City
 Upham, Charles W. Salem Witchcraft; With an Account of Salem Village and a History of Opinions on Witchcraft and Kindred Subjects
 Upham, William P. (1904). House of John Proctor, Witchcraft Martyr, 1692, Press of C. H. Shephard, Peabody, Massachusetts
 Winwar, Frances (1938). Puritan City: The Story of Salem, Robert M. McBride & Company, New York.

External links 
 

1632 births
1692 deaths
17th-century executions of American people
American people executed for witchcraft
Executed people from Massachusetts
Kingdom of England emigrants to Massachusetts Bay Colony
People executed by Massachusetts by hanging
People executed by the Province of Massachusetts Bay
People executed by the Thirteen Colonies by hanging
People from Ipswich, Massachusetts
People of the Salem witch trials